The 2017 Asian Archery Championships were the 20th edition of the event, and were held in Dhaka, Bangladesh from 25 to 30 November 2017.

Medal summary

Recurve

Compound

Medal table

References
 Results book

External links
 World Archery Link

2017 in archery
2017 in Bangladeshi sport
Asian Archery Championships
International sports competitions hosted by Bangladesh
November 2017 sports events in Bangladesh